Isthmiade planifrons is a species of beetle in the family Cerambycidae. It was described by Zajciw in 1972.

References

Isthmiade
Beetles described in 1972